Abdelhafid Benamara (born 1 October 1995) is an Algerian footballer who currently plays as a midfielder for MC Oran in the Algerian Ligue Professionnelle 1.

Career statistics

Club

Notes

References

1995 births
Living people
Algerian footballers
Association football midfielders
MC Oran players
USM El Harrach players
Algerian Ligue Professionnelle 1 players
21st-century Algerian people